Marc George Pisciotta (born August 7, 1970), is an American former professional baseball pitcher, who played in Major League Baseball (MLB) from 1997 to 1999, for the Chicago Cubs and Kansas City Royals.

Amateur career
As a Little League Baseball player, the 12-year-old,  Pisciotta used his overpowering fastball to lead the East Marietta National Little League of Marietta, Georgia, to the 1983 Little League World Series title.

Pisciotta attended George Walton Comprehensive High School and played college baseball at Georgia Tech. In 1990, he played collegiate summer baseball in the Cape Cod Baseball League for the Yarmouth-Dennis Red Sox and was named a league all-star. He was selected by the Pittsburgh Pirates in the 19th round of the 1991 MLB Draft.

Professional career
Pisciotta was claimed off waivers by the Cubs after the 1996 season, and made his major league debut with Chicago on June 30, 1997. He appeared in 24 games for the Cubs that season, and in 43 games the following season. He was released by the Cubs prior to the 1999 season, and was picked up by the Royals, appearing in eight games for Kansas City in 1999, his final major league campaign.

References

External links
, or Retrosheet

1970 births
Living people
American people of Italian descent
Major League Baseball pitchers
Baseball players from New Jersey
Chicago Cubs players
Kansas City Royals players
People from Edison, New Jersey
Buffalo Bisons (minor league) players
Yarmouth–Dennis Red Sox players
Zion Pioneerzz players
Augusta Pirates players
American expatriate baseball players in Canada
Calgary Cannons players
Carolina Mudcats players
Iowa Cubs players
Omaha Golden Spikes players
Richmond Braves players
Salem Buccaneers players
Welland Pirates players